Hillsboro Boulevard is a proposed Tri-Rail Coastal Link Green Line station in Deerfield Beach, Florida. The station is slated for construction at Hillboro Boulevard (SR 810) and Dixie Highway, west of Federal Highway (US 1).

References

External links
 Proposed site in Google Maps Street View

Deerfield Beach, Florida
Broward County, Florida
Proposed Tri-Rail stations